Cheung Wang Fung (born 21 January 1997) is an athlete from Hong Kong specialising in the sprint hurdles. He represented his country at the 2018 World Indoor Championships without advancing from the first round. Additionally, he won a bronze medal at the 2017 Asian Indoor and Martial Arts Games.

His personal bests are 13.97 seconds in the 110 metres hurdles (+1.0 m/s, Hong Kong 2017) and 7.85 seconds in the 60 metres hurdles (Ashgabat 2017). Both are current national records.

International competitions

References

1997 births
Living people
Hong Kong male hurdlers